The River Lune is a river in County Durham, England.

The Lune rises close to Lune Head Farm at the confluence of Lune Head Beck (considered by some the upper part of the Lune) and Cleve Beck. Lune Head Beck itself is formed by the meeting of Connypot Beck and Goal Sike, flowing eastward from Cumbria.

The river flows eastward through Lunedale to Selset Reservoir, after which it turns north east and feeds Grassholme Reservoir, before continuing to join the River Tees at Mickleton.

Settlements (from source)
 Grains o' th' Beck
 Thringarth
 Bowbank
 Mickleton

Tributaries (from source)
 Cleve Beck
 Rayback Sike
 Lune Head Beck
 Connypot Beck
 Goal Sike
 Long Grain
 Rennygill Sike
 Dowhill Sike
 Grow Sike
 Soulgill Beck
 Rowantree Beck
 Hargill Beck

References

Lune